Grove Green is an interface area of Leyton and Leytonstone in east London. It is situated with the London Borough of Waltham Forest. The population of the ward at the 2011 census was 14,604.

Geography
The ward's boundaries are roughly Midland, Norlington, and Pretoria Roads to the East; the north side of the M11 motorway as far as Leyton High Road to the south; the High Road itself bordering the ward to the west. Other surrounding wards are Leyton to the west, Forest to the north-east, Leytonstone to the east, and Cathall to the south.

Demography
Grove Green ward is the ninth most populous district in the borough, inhabited by slightly less than 13,000 people, with 51% being officially designated of Black Asian and Minority Asian background.

Social issues
The council, as of 2011, assessed 30% of the ward population to be in poverty.

M11 motorway extension
In the early 1990s, the southern part of the ward was the focus of a continuing protest against road-building in general and the M11 extension in particular.

Transport
The ward contains no London Overground, National Rail, or tube stations; only the High Road and Grove Green road itself serve the ward by local buses.

References

Wards of the London Borough of Waltham Forest